This list of former RNZAF stations and bases includes most of the stations, airfields and administrative headquarters previously used by the Royal New Zealand Air Force.

New Zealand

North Island

South Island

See also 

 Royal New Zealand Air Force
 List of New Zealand military bases
 New Zealand Defence Force
 List of airports in New Zealand

References

External links 

 Cambridge Air Force - RNZAF Wartime Stations, Airfields, Depots and Camps

Royal New Zealand Air Force bases
Royal New Zealand Air Force